Victor Fürth (16 February 1893 in Horaschdowitz, Bohemia  23 August 1984), was a Czech-Jewish architect working in Prague until 1939.

Life 
His firm designed the Te-Ta department Store in Prague. This 7-story building can be seen at Jungmannova Street 747/28 110 00 Praha-Nové Město (Czech Republic). It was renovated in 1997 at which time underground parking was added, and an apartment wing was included in the rear. The reinforced concrete building contains a parterre which allows passage between Jungmannova Street and the Franciscan Garden.

He also joined with Ernst Mühlstein in the design of the large apartment complex in Prague called Molochov on Milady Horákové Street 74 in the years 1936–1938.

When the Nazi regime came to power in Czechoslovakia, he had to leave and fled to the United States through Great Britain. In Oxford, Ohio Victor Furth joined the faculty at Miami University as a Professor of Architecture. Among his designs were the Bern Street Apartments having large bedrooms and hardwood floors and numerous houses for Miami faculty, often employing a cathedral ceiling. He died on 23 August 1984 in Oxford, Ohio. Throughout his teaching career Furth was denied tenure and instead had been on an annually renewed contract; however, in September 2006, he was posthumously granted the title of Professor Emeritus by Miami University.

References 
 Location of the Te-Ta department Store via Google Earth Latitude 50.0807 N Longitude 14.4225 E
 Location of the Bern Street Apartments via Google Earth Latitude 39.5046 N Longitude -84.7399 W
 Vila Schück see: http://langweil.info/index.php/200711297170/Vila-Schuck.html
 Vila Schück may be viewed in Google Map or Google Earth (Street View) at 39 Nad Kazankou, Prague
 Molochov apartments may be viewed in Google Map or Google Earth (Street View) at Milady Horákové 74, Prague
 Molochov apartments: http://langweil.info/index.php/200711296725/Molochov.html

Fürth & Mühlstein (Czechoslovakia)
 1923-24 Residence, Českomalinská 41, Prague
 1927 Residence for Dr Engel, Prague-Podol
 1928 Residence for Alexandr Schück, Nad Kázankou 39, Prague-Troja
 1928 Residence for G Barth, Prague-Bubeneč
 1928 Residence for Dr L Winter, Prague-Bubeneč
 1932 Residence, Česká Kamenice (Böhmisch-Kamnitz)
 1933 Te-Ta (Teweles-Taussig) Department Store, Jungmannova 28, Prague
 1935-1937 Apartments, Soukenická 27–29, Prague 
 1937-1939 Apartments, Masarykovo nábřeží 1, Prague

The above chronology is found in a page on Victor Furth's former partner in Prague, Ernst Mühlstein
 http://www.builtheritage.com.au/dua_milston.html
 http://www.southcampusquarter.com/about.html

External links 
 
 Brown-Manrique, Gerardo: "Three Houses in Northeastern Bohemia by Fürth and Mühlstein," in Umění, LIII/2005, pp. 34–43.

1893 births
1984 deaths
20th-century Czech people
Czechoslovak architects
Jewish architects
20th-century American architects
Czech exiles
Czechoslovak emigrants to the United States
American people of Czech-Jewish descent
Miami University faculty
People from Horažďovice
Burials at Oxford Cemetery, Oxford, Ohio